Margo or Margó is a female given name, a form of Margaret. In Estonia, it is also a male given name.

Notable people or characters named Margo include:

Given name 
Margo Barton, New Zealand fashion designer and milliner
Margo Dydek (1974–2011), Polish basketball player
Margo Erlam (born 2002), Canadian diver
Margo Feiden (1944–2022), American art dealer and author 
Margo Glantz (born 1930), Mexican writer, essayist, critic and academic
Margo Guryan (1937–2021), American singer/songwriter
Margo Harshman (born 1986), American actress 
Margo Hayes (born 1998), American rock climber
Margó Ingvardsson (born 1941), Swedish politician
Margo Kõlar (born 1961), Estonian composer
Margo Lion (1899–1989), French chanteuse, parodist, cabaret singer and actress
Margo MacDonald (1943–2014), Scottish politician
Margo Maeckelberghe (1932–2014), Cornish bard and artist
Margo Martindale (born 1951), American actress
Margo Price (born 1983), American singer/songwriter
Margo Reuten (born 1966), Dutch head chef
Margo Scharten-Antink (1868–1957), Dutch poet
Margo Seltzer, American computer science professor
Margo Simms, known as Margeaux, Canadian entertainer
Margo Smith (born 1942), American country music singer
Margo Taft Stever, American poet
Margo Stilley (born 1982), American actress and writer
Margo Vliegenthart (born 1958), Dutch politician

Nickname or stage name 
 Margaret "Margo" Durrell (1920–2007), younger sister of novelist Lawrence Durrell, and elder sister of naturalist Gerald Durrell
 Margo (actress) (1917–1985), Mexican-American actress, born María Marguerita Guadalupe Teresa Estela Bolado Castilla y O'Donnell
 Margo (magician), American television magic performer and daughter of Frances Willard
 Margo (singer) (born 1951), Margeret Catherine O'Donnell, Irish singer

Fictional characters 
 Margo Masse, a character played by Alyssa Milano in the movie Fear
 Margo, a character played by Carmen Electra in Meet The Spartans
 Margo, an alternate name for Fujiko Mine in the 1979 Toho/Frontier English dub of The Mystery of Mamo
 Margo Sherman, a character in the American animated series The Critic
 Margo Leadbetter, a character in the British sitcom The Good Life
 Margo Roth Spiegelman, a character in the book and movie (played by Cara Delevingne) Paper Towns by John Green
 Margo Magee, a character in the soap opera comic Apartment 3G
 Margo Lane, a character from The Shadow stories, radio program, and film
 Margo Gru, a character in the Despicable Me franchise
 Margo Huntington, character on The Edge of Night (1978-1980)
 Margo Channing, a character played by Bette Davis in All About Eve
 Margo Hanson, a character in the TV show The Magicians
 Margo, a character in Pokémon: The Power of Us.
 Margo Madison, a character in For All Mankind (TV series).

References

Dutch feminine given names
English feminine given names
English-language feminine given names
Estonian feminine given names
Given names derived from gemstones